The Louisville Cardinal is the independent weekly student newspaper of the University of Louisville in Louisville, Kentucky, USA. It is published every Tuesday during the academic year and once in late April for distribution throughout the summer. The Louisville Cardinal was founded in 1926 and has maintained financial and editorial independence since 1980.  Recent advisers include Robert Schulman, Vince Staten, Kim Speirs, Mickey Meece and Ralph Merkel (current). Its Editor-In-Chief is Tate Luckey. Writers and editors of The Cardinal have gone on to work for the Associated Press, The Courier-Journal, Dallas Morning News, The Herald Leader, The Jeffersonville Evening News, Louisville Eccentric Observer (LEO), The New York Times, and Reuters. This paper contains News, Sports, Opinion and Features and hits the stands every Tuesday.

Archives
The Louisville Cardinal keeps a physical archive of past issues in their campus office at the University of Louisville, located in the Houchens Building.  A digital archive was created in 2014 and includes all subsequent issues.

You can also find past issues on their main page under "issues" https://www.louisvillecardinal.com/this-weeks-issue/

Other publications

In 2013, The Louisville Cardinal published a commemorative book for the NCAA Division I Men's Basketball Championship title.  Unbreakable: Louisville's Inspired Championship Run features interviews, photography, and analysis produced by student reporters during the 2013 basketball season. The book also features writing about the University of Louisville's women's basketball team, who made it to the Final Four in the same season.

See also

List of student newspapers

References

External links
 

Student newspapers published in Kentucky
University of Louisville
Publications established in 1926
1926 establishments in Kentucky
Newspapers published in Louisville, Kentucky